Pat Patriot, commonly referred to as "Pat The Patriot," is the mascot of the New England Patriots, a National Football League (NFL) franchise based in Foxborough, Massachusetts. He is depicted as a soldier of the American Revolution. The logo version of Pat wears a tricorne hat and a Continental Army uniform. This was the Patriots' official insignia until 1993, when it was replaced by the current logo which is known as "Flying Elvis". Today, Pat Patriot is used for throwback merchandise as well as an alternate logo across the Patriots branding. Logo Pat was created by Worcester  Telegram - Evening Gazette cartoonist Phil Bissell in 1960.

1979 new logo consideration

In 1979 the Patriots considered replacing Pat Patriot with a new logo, mainly because Pat Patriot was very detailed and was therefore difficult to replicate accurately on various promotional materials and merchandise.  Unsure if this would be a good decision for the team, executives decided to let the fans vote for the logo they preferred during halftime of a Patriots' home game. Pat Patriot was the overwhelming victor.

Live mascot development
The live mascot Pat was originally developed in the early 1990s and made one of his first public appearances at the 1995 Pro Bowl as a Team NFL Hero. Team NFL Heroes were a line of mascot-like characters developed by NFL Properties; most of the characters only lasted a season or two but a handful ended up being adopted as official mascots by their respective teams, either immediately after the Team NFL Heroes project was canceled or years later with Pat being an example of the former. The live mascot Pat we know of today was intended at first to be a completely different character from the Pat Patriot logo; this is supported by the fact that Pat's name was listed as "Revere" (a reference to Paul Revere) on Team NFL Heroes merchandise.

Live mascot character design
Live mascot Pat wears either the Patriots' home uniform which consists of the navy blue jersey, number 1, with newly revealed navy blue pants or the away uniform which consists of the white jersey, number 1, with navy blue pants.  Which uniform Pat wears depends on which uniform the team wears in the game he is appearing at. Pat previously wore jersey number 0 until a fan approached team owner Robert Kraft and asked if the number could be changed.  This interaction was caught on tape by NFL Films and shown on television.

Super Bowl appearances
Pat has represented the Patriots as the team's live mascot in ten of the eleven Super Bowls the team has appeared in: XXXI, XXXVI, XXXVIII, XXXIX, XLII, XLVI, XLIX, LI, LII and LIII.

Performer

References

External links
 Pat Patriot at the New England Patriots' official website
 Pat Patriot on Twitter

New England Patriots
National Football League mascots